Juan Carlos Scannone, SJ (2 September 1931 – 27 November 2019), was an Italian Argentine Roman Catholic Jesuit priest. 

Scannone entered the Society of Jesus in 1949. His academic career began in 1956 when he completed his studies of philosophy at the Philosophical and Theological Faculty of San Miguel in Buenos Aires Province, Argentina.   He obtained a doctorate in theology with a thesis written in Innsbruck, directed by Karl Rahner, and one in philosophy with a dissertation on Maurice Blondel, presented at the Ludwig Maximilian University of Munich in Germany. 

Scannone was an instructor in the Jesuit Seminary of San Miguel in Argentina. There, he was one of the main teachers of Jorge Bergoglio, who later became Pope Francis. Arguably, few theologians influenced Francis as much as Scannone.  He was is also the leading Argentine formulator of the theology of the people, which is somewhat related to the philosophy and theology of liberation, or liberation theology. This Argentine current of liberation theology, which greatly influenced Bergoglio, has other exponents such as Lucio Gera and Rafael Tello.The principles of theology of the people articulate a strong embrace of Christianity, coupled with local initiated non-paternalistic ways to help the poor.

References

DePaul University speaker bio of Scannone

1931 births
2019 deaths
Argentine Jesuits
20th-century Argentine Roman Catholic priests
Ludwig Maximilian University of Munich alumni